Glenbrook, California may refer to:
Glenbrook, Lake County, California
Glenbrook, Nevada County, California